Najeebullah Anjum (born 1955) is a Pakistani film and TV actor. He was born in Peshawar, and grew up there, attending Forward High School and later graduating from Edwardes High School.

During his career, Anjum appeared in 500 television plays for Pakistan Television Corporation by 2007.

Anjum has also worked in a few films. His debut film was Rauf Khalid's 2003 period drama Laaj. He also acted in Shoaib Mansoor's 2007 contemporary drama Khuda Ke Liye.

Filmography 
 Laaj (2003)
 Khuda Ke Liye (2007)
 Revenge of the Worthless (2015)

Awards
Anjum was awarded Pride of Performance, best PTV actor in 1986 and the Medal of Excellence in 2005.

See also 
 List of Lollywood actors

References

External links
 

1955 births
Living people
Pashtun people
People from Peshawar
Pakistani male film actors
Pakistani male television actors